Religion in Greece is dominated by Christianity, in particular the Greek Orthodox Church, which is within the larger communion of the Eastern Orthodox Church. It represented 90% of the total population in 2015 and is constitutionally recognized as the "prevailing religion" of Greece. Religions with smaller numbers of followers include Islam (comprising 2% of the population), Catholicism (comprising less than 1% of the population), Evangelicalism, Hellenic Paganism, Sikhism and Hinduism. Also a small number of Greek Atheists exists, not self-identifying as religious. Religion is key part of identity for most Greeks, with 76% of Greeks in a 2015-17 survey saying that their nationality is defined by Christianity. Statistics on metaphysics and worldview, do not concern narrowly only the hyponym religion.
According to other sources, 81.4% of Greeks identify as Orthodox Christians and 14.7% are atheists.

Christianity
As of 2015, 93% of the population of Greece was Christian.

Eastern Orthodoxy

The Church of Greece, a member of the Eastern Orthodox Communion, is accorded the status of "prevailing religion" in Greece's constitution. Since 1850, Greek Orthodoxy within Greece is handled by the Church. Its members comprise between 88% and 95-98%  of the population, the most recent Pew report gave a percentage of 90% as 2015 numbers.

The status of the Orthodox church as the "prevailing religion" is largely based on the role the church played for the preservation of the Greek nation through the years of the Ottoman Empire but also for the role the church played in the Greek War of Independence. As a result, many attribute to the modern Greek nation an ethnoreligious identity.

Furthermore, the mainstream Orthodox clergy's salaries and pensions are paid for by the State at rates comparable to those of teachers. All Greek students in primary and secondary schools in Greece attend Christian Orthodox instruction, although there is an exemption system for students who do not want to attend, as long as the exemption is requested by both parents.

Catholicism

Catholics made up less than 1% of the total population in 2015. The Catholic community has increased in size in recent years due to immigration and today number over 200,000.

Roman Catholics

Roman Catholic Greeks number approximately 50,000 and are found all over Greece; the majority, however, live in the Cyclades and the Ionian Islands. The presence of Catholics in the Greek islands is mostly a heritage from the time of the Venetian domination from the Middle Ages. The Catholic community has increased in size in recent years due to immigration and today number over 200,000.

Greek Catholics

Catholic Greeks of the Byzantine Rite (Uniates or Unites) number approximately 6,000 nationwide and mostly live in Athens.

Protestantism

Protestants, including Greek Evangelical Church and Free Evangelical Churches, stand at about 30,000. The Free Apostolic Church of the Pentecost was founded by Leonidas Feggos in 1965. The official church, Eastern Orthodox, and the State reluctantly gave permission for Pentecostal churches to operate legally. The process of receiving permission from the Ministry of Education and Religion to operate as a church is becoming easier. Assemblies of God, the International Church of the Foursquare Gospel and other Pentecostal churches of the Greek Synod of Apostolic Church have 12,000 members. The Independent Free Apostolic Church of Pentecost is the biggest Protestant denomination in Greece with 120 churches. There are no official statistics about Free Apostolic Church of Pentecost, but the Orthodox Church estimates the followers at 20,000.

Armenian Church

The presence of Armenians in Greece dates back centuries (from the Byzantine period), when Armenians settled in Thessalia, Macedonia, Thrace and the islands of Crete and Corfu for various reasons such as war or business.

The Armenians in Greece acquired the character of a community after the 1920s, when 70,000 to 80,000 survivors of the Armenian genocide fled to Greece. Today, emigration to North America has diminished the Armenian population of Greece. The number now counts for roughly 20,000-35,000 Greco-Armenians.

Islam

The number of citizens of Greece who are Muslims is estimated to be at 97,604 people or 0.95% of the total population, according to the 1991 census. They live mostly in Western Thrace and are primarily of Turkish, Slavonic (Pomak) and Romani descent. Immigrant Muslims are estimated between 200,000-300,000. and approximately half of them live in Athens. In 2015, Islam was the religion of 2% of the total population of Greece.

Judaism

The Jewish community in Greece currently amounts to roughly 5,500 people, concentrated mainly in Athens, Thessaloniki, Larissa, Volos, Chalkis, Ioannina, Trikala and Corfu, while very few remain in Kavala and Rhodes. It is composed largely of two groups, the Romaniotes, Jewish communities dating back to Antiquity, and the Ladino-speaking Sephardim, who arrived from Spain and settled chiefly in Thessaloniki during Ottoman times.

Buddhism

The number of the followers is not so high amongst the Greeks but it has increased during the last decades because of the immigration of people from East Asia, Sri Lanka and Southeast Asia in Greece. Sri Lankan and Southeast Asian migrant workers working in Greece were usually sent back to their home country to be cremated, due to cremation being banned in Greece until 2006. Today there are three religious centers, in Athens, Thessaloniki and Corinth.

Hinduism

Hinduism in Greece has a small following. There is a small Hindu community in Athens. There are 25 PIOs and 12 NRIs in the city. On March 1, 2006, the Greek government passed a law allowing cremation. The law was welcomed by the Indian community in Athens.

Sikhism
 
Sikhs have been in Greece since the World Wars, as part of the British Indian Army. Guru Nanak is also known to have passed through Greece during one of his journeys. However, actual immigration to Greece began in the 1970s. It reached its peak during the 1990s-2000s. As of 2017, Sikhs are estimated to number 20,000-25,000. There are eight Gurudwaras in Greece, most of them based in Central Greece and only one being in Crete. Gurudwaras are often officially documented as personal properties, community centres or libraries, due to the paperwork needed and also due to the lack of recognition of Sikhs by the Greek Government. Sikhs often face racism and discrimination by the Greek public, who confuse them with Muslims, as well as legal challenges, mostly due to the distinct appearance (The Five Ks). Sikhs are not allowed to wear their turbans and ride motorcycles without helmets, as in the United Kingdom, where their contributions in the war efforts were recognized and they were allowed to not wear helmets. Young Sikhs often face difficulties when recruited for the mandatory conscription in Greece, due to their long hair, beard and turbans. Sikhism is still not an officially recognized in Greece and Sikhs are often not included in censuses. Media coverage of Sikhs is minimal and their religion is often reported as a mix of Hinduism and Islam, while it has a separate belief system and many differences. Sikh Gurudwaras have faced numerous attacks including gunshots and molotov cocktails. On March 1, 2006, the Greek government passed a law allowing cremation, a move welcomed by both Sikhs and Hindus. Since the financial crisis of 2007–2008, many Sikhs have migrated to other countries, such as the United Kingdom, Canada, and Germany.

Hellenic ethnic religion

Over 2000 people are members of the Supreme Council of Ethnic Hellenes, the foremost organisation of Hellenic ethnic religion. Over 100,000 people are "sympathisers". On 9 April 2017 the Hellenic ethnic religion was officially recognized by the Greek state.

Other faiths
Other minor faiths in Greece include Jehovah's Witnesses (who number about 28,000), Seventh-day Adventists, Mormons and Scientologists. Groups that constitute less than 1 percent of the population includes those of the Baháʼí Faith.

Gallery

See also
Timeline of Orthodoxy in Greece
Religion in ancient Greece
Religion by country

References

Sources
US Department of State Country Reports on Human Rights Practices  - 2006: Greece
Tomkinson, John L., Between Heaven and Earth: The Greek Church, Anagnosis (Athens, 2004)